Louis or Lou Johnson may refer to:

Government and politics
Louis Johnson (politician) (born 1937), American politician
Louis A. Johnson (1891–1966), second United States Secretary of Defense
Louis Stanley Johnson (1869–1937), English politician

Sports
Lou Johnson (1932–2020), American baseball player
Lou Johnson (pitcher) (1869–1941), baseball player
Louis "Dicta" Johnson (1887– ), American baseball pitcher
Louis Johnson (boxer) (born 1938), American Olympic boxer

Others
Louis Johnson (poet) (1924–1988), New Zealand poet
Lou Johnson (singer) (1941–2019), American soul singer
Louis Johnson (bassist) (1955–2015), American electric bassist
S. Lewis Johnson (1915–2004), evangelical pastor and theologian

See also
Lewis Johnson (disambiguation)